Buire-au-Bois is a commune in the Pas-de-Calais department in the Hauts-de-France region in northern France.

Geography
A small farming commune located 25 miles (40 km) west of Arras on the D117 road, at the junction with the D102.

Buire-au-Bois is a typical rural community, comprising the village itself and the hamlet of Bachimont. Through various reasons, such as the lack of employment, many young people have moved out of the area. Many houses are being bought and used by English and Dutch francophiles.

Population

Sights
 The church of Notre-Dame, dating from the eighteenth century
 The eighteenth-century château.
 A seventeenth-century manor house.

See also
Communes of the Pas-de-Calais department

References

Communes of Pas-de-Calais